The black dwarf hornbill (Horizocerus hartlaubi) or western little hornbill, is a species of hornbill in the family Bucerotidae. It is widely spread across the African tropical rainforest.

Description 
It is black with a curved beak and a wide white brow above its eye.

References

black dwarf hornbill
black dwarf hornbill
Taxonomy articles created by Polbot